Live! 8-24-1979 is the second official live album by American new wave band The B-52s. The concert was recorded on August 24, 1979 at The Berklee Center in  Boston, Massachusetts, before the release of their second album.

The show recorded was part of their B-52's Tour.

Rhino released the album as a high-resolution download, as well as MP3 and Mastered for iTunes.

Track listing
"52 Girls (With Intro)" – 3:57
"6060-842" – 2:38
"Lava" – 5:03
"Private Idaho" – 3:52
"Devil in My Car" – 5:34
"Dance This Mess Around" – 4:49
"Runnin' Around" – 3:20
"Rock Lobster (With Encore Outro)" – 5:46
"Strobe Light" – 4:35

Personnel
The B-52's
Fred Schneider – vocals, percussion
Kate Pierson – vocals, keyboards
Cindy Wilson – vocals, percussion
Keith Strickland – drums
Ricky Wilson – guitar

References

2015 live albums
Rhino Entertainment live albums
The B-52's live albums